The Enhanced Chip Set (ECS) is the second generation of the Amiga computer's chipset, offering minor improvements over the original chipset (OCS) design. ECS was introduced in 1990 with the launch of the Amiga 3000. Amigas produced from 1990 onwards featured a mix of OCS and ECS chips, such as later versions of the Amiga 500 and the Commodore CDTV. Other ECS models were the Amiga 500+ in 1991 and lastly the Amiga 600 in 1992.

Notable improvements were the Super Agnus and the HiRes Denise chips. The sound and floppy controller chip, Paula, remained unchanged from the OCS design. Super Agnus supports 2 MB of Chip RAM, whereas the original Agnus/Fat Agnus and subsequent Fatter Agnus can address 512 KB and 1 MB, respectively. The ECS Denise chip offers Productivity (640×480 non-interlaced) and SuperHiRes (1280×200 or 1280×256) display modes (also available in interlaced mode), which are however limited to only 4 on-screen colors. Essentially, a 35 ns pixel mode was added plus the ability to run arbitrary horizontal and vertical scan rates. This made other display modes possible, but only the aforementioned modes were supported originally out of the box. For example, the Linux Amiga framebuffer device driver allows the use of several other display modes. Other improvements were the ability of the blitter to copy regions larger than 1024×1024 pixels in one operation and the ability to display sprites in border regions (outside of any display window where bitplanes are shown). ECS also allows software switching between 60 Hz and 50 Hz video modes.

These improvements largely favored application software, which benefited from higher resolution and VGA-like display modes, rather than games. As an incremental update, ECS was intended to be backward compatible with software designed for OCS machines, though some pre-ECS games were found to be incompatible. Additionally, features from the improved Kickstart 2 operating system were used in subsequent software, and since these two technologies largely overlap, some users misjudged the significance of ECS. It is possible to upgrade some OCS machines, such as the Amiga 500, to obtain partial or full ECS functionality by replacing OCS chips with ECS versions. ECS was followed by the third generation AGA chipset with the launch of the Amiga 4000 and Amiga 1200 in 1992.

See also
 OCS
 Amiga Ranger Chipset
 AGA
 Amiga custom chips
 AAA
 AA+
 Hombre chipset
 List of home computers by video hardware

Amiga chipsets
Graphics chips
MOS Technology integrated circuits
Sound chips
AmigaOS